The Yasuní River is a river of eastern Ecuador. It is a tributary of the Napo River.

See also
List of rivers of Ecuador

References
 Rand McNally, The New International Atlas, 1993.
  GEOnet Names Server
 Water Resources Assessment of Ecuador

Rivers of Ecuador